Phthersigena minor is a species of praying mantis native to Australia.

See also
List of mantis genera and species

References

Mantidae
Insects of Australia
Insects described in 1918